Hamilton Soares de Sá (born 31 May 1991) is a Brazilian professional footballer who plays as a striker for Thai League 1 club Port.

Honours

Individual
Thai League 1 Top Scorer (1): 2021–22

References 

 

1991 births
Living people
Brazilian footballers
Association football forwards
Brazilian expatriate footballers
Brazilian expatriate sportspeople in Kuwait
Expatriate footballers in Kuwait
Brazilian expatriate sportspeople in Thailand
Expatriate footballers in Thailand
Thai League 1 players
Port F.C. players
Nongbua Pitchaya F.C. players
People from Manaus
Sportspeople from Amazonas (Brazilian state)